Cristian Dorin Tudor (23 August 1982 – 23 December 2012) was a Romanian football striker.

He died of hepatic cirrhosis.

Honours

Club
Sheriff Tiraspol
Divizia Națională: 2001–02, 2002–03, 2003–04
Moldovan Cup: 2002
Moldovan Super Cup: 2003
CIS Cup: 2003

Individual 
CIS Cup top goalscorer: 2003

References

External links
  Player page on the official FC Alania Vladikavkaz  website

1982 births
2012 deaths
Sportspeople from Bistrița
Romanian footballers
ACF Gloria Bistrița players
U.S. Pistoiese 1921 players
FC Sheriff Tiraspol players
FC Moscow players
FC Spartak Vladikavkaz players
Romanian expatriate footballers
Expatriate footballers in Russia
Expatriate footballers in Moldova
Russian Premier League players
Romanian expatriate sportspeople in Moldova
Liga I players
Deaths from cirrhosis
Association football forwards
21st-century Romanian people